was the practice of removing the natural eyebrows and painting smudge-like eyebrows on the forehead in pre-modern Japan, particularly in the Heian period (794–1185).

 means "pull" and  means "eyebrows". Aristocratic women used to pluck or shave their eyebrows and paint new ones using a powdered ink called , which was made of soot from sesame or rapeseed oils.

History
 first appeared in the eighth century, when the Japanese court adopted Chinese customs and styles. Japanese noblewomen started painting their faces with a white powder called . At this time, eyebrows were painted in arc shapes, as in China.

Japanese culture began to flourish in its own right during the Heian period (794-1185 CE), as Japanese arts and culture flourished in their own right at the Imperial Court in Kyoto. Women also began to paint their faces more thickly, and began painting their eyebrows as ovals or ovoid smudges on their foreheads, above the placement of their natural eyebrows.

One theorised reason behind the move towards highly-stylised eyebrows is that as hairstyles on women transitioned into long hair left to hang down naturally on each side of the face, the forehead became too prominent, and that painting the eyebrows as ovals halfway up the forehead redressed this balance.

The practice of  continued even into the latter portion of the Heian period; men in particular painted their faces white, blackened their teeth and redrew their eyebrows in its later years. As a fashion for women,  lasted for a number of centuries afterwards. In Noh drama, which started in the 14th century, the masks for the roles of young women typically have eyebrows in the  style.

Beginning in the Edo period (1603-1867), both  and  transitioned into a practice seen only on married women. In the latter half of the 19th century, the Japanese government ended its policy of isolationism and started to adopt Western culture.

Apprentice geisha in some quarters of Japan - typically in Kyoto - may also practice  before graduating into geisha status.

In literature
 is mentioned in both of the great literary classics of the Heian period, The Tale of Genji and The Pillow Book. The passage from The Tale of Genji, near the end of the sixth chapter, concerns a girl aged about ten who is living in the palace of the Emperor Nijo. The original Japanese, romanization, and Edward Seidensticker's translation are as follows.

Because of her grandmother's conservative preferences, her teeth had not yet been blackened or her eyebrows plucked. Genji had put one of the women to blackening her eyebrows, which drew fresh, graceful arcs.

The translation by Royall Tyler is:
In deference to her grandmother's old-fashioned manners her teeth had not yet received any blacking, but he had had her made up, and the sharp line of her eyebrows was very attractive.

In Meredith McKinney's translation of the Pillow Book, section 80 reads:

Things that create the appearance of deep emotion – The sound of your voice when you're constantly blowing your runny nose as you talk. Plucking your eyebrows.

In cinema
In , which is based on King Lear,  can be seen on Mieko Harada as Lady Kaede.

Notes

References

Cultural history of Japan
Japanese fashion
Chinese traditions